, abbreviated as , is a Japanese light novel series written by Toshio Satō and illustrated by Nao Watanuki. SB Creative released fifteen volumes under their GA Bunko label from February 2017 to July 2022. The light novel is licensed in North America by Yen Press and the English translation is done by Andrew Cunningham. A manga adaptation with art by Hajime Fusemachi has been serialized online since September 2017 via Square Enix's online manga magazine Gangan Online. It has been collected in ten tankōbon volumes. An anime television series adaptation by Liden Films aired from January to March 2021.

Characters

Lloyd is a teenage boy from the legendary town of Kunlun who left to become a soldier in the kingdom's army. In his village, he is known as a weakling who cannot perform any typical jobs to the "normal" expected level. However, the standards of this town, in the most dangerous region of the world, are incredibly skewed and truthfully he is terrifyingly powerful by outside standards. He is kind and generous, eager to help and very humble. He excels at cooking and cleaning, but cannot be convinced of his true power.

A teenage witch who lives in the east side slums of the capital of Azami, selling potions to the residents, usually for information rather than money on account of the poverty in the east side. She is a former pupil of Alka and secretly the missing princess of the kingdom, .

The village chief of Kunlun Village. While she resembles a twelve-year-old girl, she is actually hundreds of years old, and an incredibly powerful magic user. She deliberately filled Lloyd's mind with stories of the army to convince him to leave. She secretly has a crush on him and frequently teleports to the capital to check up on him.

Also known as the "Cursed Belt Princess". Daughter of a noble, Selen was cursed as a child by a magic belt that wrapped tightly around her head and could not be removed by any known magic. This accident led to scandal and shame to the nobility. She desperately developed her strength on account of a claim that power greater than the belt would break it, and came to the capital to join the army and further hone her power. When Lloyd broke the curse on their first meeting, she developed a very powerful crush on him. She has a tendency to talk of herself and Lloyd as already being mutually in love and showing animosity toward those she perceives as rivals. It is later revealed that the belt is made from the skin of Vritra, a divine beast native to Kunlun, and protects the wearer from all evil.

A mercenary with one arm. Her left arm has been replaced with a powerful mechanical prosthesis. She joined the army as part of an agreement with the military instructor Merthophan Dextro in exchange for having her criminal record expunged. She is constantly watching for ways to use others to her benefit.

A student of noble background who looks down on Selen as the "Cursed Belt Princess", fearing her presence could damage his own status. After being helped by Lloyd during Abaddon's attack, he assists in getting Lloyd enrolled at the academy. He looks up to Lloyd's strength and declared himself as his student.

An instructor at the Azami military academy who scouted several of the new students. He wanted to start a war to avenge his village, and manipulated the king into doing so, before instead being controlled by the king, at the time possessed by the Demon Lord Abaddon. After the Demon Lord's defeat, Merthophan is sentenced to work near Kunlun with Alka.

A former bodyguard for Marie who retired and opened a café after her disappearance. He hired Lloyd after Lloyd initially failed his entry exam, before returning to the military as a teacher after the Demon Lord Abaddon was defeated, to cover for Merthophan.

Media

Light novel

Manga
A manga adaptation with art by Hajime Fusemachi began serialization in Square Enix's online manga magazine Gangan Online on September 28, 2017. Square Enix is also publishing the series in English.

A spin-off manga with art by Souchuu titled Tatoeba Last Dungeon Mae no Mura no Shōnen ga Joban no Machi no Shokudō de Hataraku Nichijō Monogatari was serialized in Square Enix's Monthly Shōnen Gangan magazine from January 11, 2020, to February 12, 2022 and collected into four volumes.

Volume list

Suppose a Kid from the Last Dungeon Boonies Moved to a Starter Town

Tatoeba Last Dungeon Mae no Mura no Shōnen ga Joban no Machi no Shokudō de Hataraku Nichijō Monogatari

Anime
An anime television series adaptation was announced during a livestream for the "GA Fes 2019" event on October 19, 2019. The series was animated by Liden Films and directed by migmi, with Deko Akao handling series composition, Makoto Iino designing the characters, and Michiru composing the series' music. The series was originally set to premiere in October 2020, but was delayed and it aired from January 4 to March 22, 2021. The opening theme song is  performed by Haruka Yamazaki, while the ending theme song is "I'mpossible?" performed by Luce Twinkle Wink☆. 

Funimation acquired the series and streamed it on its website in North America, the British Isles, Mexico, and Brazil, in Europe through Wakanim, and in Australia and New Zealand through AnimeLab. Following Sony's acquisition of Crunchyroll, the series was moved to Crunchyroll. In Southeast Asia and South Asia, Muse Communication licensed the series and streamed it on its Muse Asia YouTube channel and Bilibili in Southeast Asia.

Video game
A free-to-play smartphone game developed for Android and iOS devices was released in Japan and traditional Chinese-speaking areas in 2021.

Notes

References

External links
 

 

2017 Japanese novels
2021 anime television series debuts
Adventure anime and manga
Anime and manga based on light novels
Anime postponed due to the COVID-19 pandemic
AT-X (TV network) original programming
Comedy anime and manga
Crunchyroll anime
Fantasy anime and manga
GA Bunko
Gangan Comics manga
Gangan Online manga
Japanese webcomics
Liden Films
Light novels
Muse Communication
NBCUniversal Entertainment Japan
Shōnen manga
Webcomics in print
Yen Press titles